Six ships that were built for the Royal Navy have borne the name HMS Ocean. The name Ocean entered the list from which names are selected for British ships in 1759, when the Royal Navy captured the French ship named . The British studied the French technology of this ship and admired it, but the ship had to be in bad shape before it would be replaced by a new-build.
 , was a 90-gun ship of the line built in 1761.
 , was a 98-gun ship of the line launched in 1805, active in the Napoleonic Wars, and later upgraded to a 110-gun first-rate.
  was originally ordered to be built as a Bulwark-class wooden screw line-of battle ship intended to carry 91 guns. In the late 1860s she served as flagship to the Commander-in-Chief, China and after an active life of only six years, was paid off in 1872.
  was a Canopus-class pre-dreadnought battleship launched in 1898 and sunk by a mine in 1915.
  was an  completed in 1945, served in the Korean War as an aircraft carrier, and the Suez Crisis as a helicopter platform and was scrapped in 1962.
  was a Landing Platform, Helicopter (LPH) launched in 1995 and decommissioned in March 2018, after which she was transferred to the Brazilian Navy as Atlântico.

Battle Honours
Ushant 1781
Mesopotamia 1914
Suez Canal 1915
Dardanelles 1915
Korea 1952–53
Al Faw 2003

References

Royal Navy ship names